Wahconah Park is a city-owned baseball park located in Pittsfield, Massachusetts and nestled in a working-class neighborhood. One of the last remaining ballparks in the United States with a wooden grandstand, it was constructed in 1919 and seats 4,500. Through the park's history, 201 different Pittsfield players went on to the Major Leagues, and 100 different Pittsfield players already had some Major League experience.  The park was listed on the National Register of Historic Places in 2005.

In the July 23, 1990 issue of Sports Illustrated, author Daniel Okrent raved about the park in his column entitled Just A Little Bit of Heaven – Pittsfield's Wahconah Park is Baseball as it Oughta Be.

In 2012, the stadium became the home field of the Pittsfield Suns, an expansion franchise of the Futures Collegiate Baseball League.

Field configuration
Former park dimensions were 334 feet to left field, 374 feet to center field, and 333 feet to right field. The current field dimensions are 310 feet down the left field line, 377 feet to left field, 374 feet to center field, 403 feet to right-center field, and 305 feet down the right field line.

Because the field was constructed before the advent of field lighting, no harm was seen in orienting the diamond due west. It is one of only two professional ballparks in the U.S. today that faces west (the other being Sam Lynn Ballpark in Bakersfield, California, built in 1941). Lights were not installed until 1946. In 1989 a mesh screen was placed in center field. Nevertheless, some umpires still briefly suspend games at sunset, so that the setting sun will not interfere with the batters' view of the pitch.

In 1927, a dike was installed on the Housatonic River to prevent recurrent flooding.

History
The Pittsfield Mets were a minor-league baseball team moved to Pittsfield, Massachusetts from Little Falls, New York, by an investment group organized by Michael T. Casey. The team played in the New York - Penn League, and were affiliated with the New York Mets from 1989 to 2000 and the Houston Astros in 2001.

In 2002, the independent Berkshire Black Bears moved to Wahconah Park after three years of dormancy as the Massachusetts Mad Dogs. After the 2003 season, they did not renew their lease but moved to New Haven, Connecticut.

Jim Bouton proposed to renovate the park without any public dollars and bring professional baseball back. On July 3, 2004, a record crowd of 5,000 attended a vintage baseball game he organized at Wahconah Park between Pittsfield and Hartford, a game telecast live for over four hours on ESPN Classic as America's Pastime: Vintage Baseball, Live. Commentators included Bouton, Bill Lee, actor Tim Robbins, and baseball historians John Thorn and David Pietrusza. Eventually, Pittsfield politics intervened and Bouton was forced out.

In 2005, former Boston Red Sox General Manager Dan Duquette brought the Pittsfield Dukes, a New England Collegiate Baseball League (NECBL) team, to Wahconah Park. During the 2007 season, the Dukes attracted a season attendance of 28,955 through 21 home games, averaging 1,378 fans per game. His agreement with the City of Pittsfield was jeopardized prior to the 2008 season over back maintenance fees, but Duquette and city officials reached a settlement. For the 2009 season, Duquette restyled the team the Pittsfield American Defenders, with a military theme. The park was called Nokona Stadium at Wahconah Park pursuant to a sponsorship deal with the manufacturer of baseball gloves that funded all-new bathrooms, stadium offices, and press box. On May 3, 2009, Williams College and Amherst College alumni played a game under 1859 rules to commemorate the 150th-anniversary of the first college baseball game, played between the two schools. Duquette, an alumnus of Amherst, was instrumental in organizing the event.

The Pittsfield American Defenders lasted only one season. In 2010, Duquette moved the NECBL franchise to his baseball camp in nearby Hinsdale, and moved his Can-Am League entry, the New Hampshire American Defenders, to Wahconah Park from Nashua, New Hampshire; they were known as the Pittsfield Colonials.

Current tenant
In 2012, the Pittsfield Suns, an expansion franchise of the Futures Collegiate Baseball League, began playing at Wahconah Park. Marvin Goldklang is the majority owner; the Goldklang Group also owns part of the club. Goldklang owned and operated the Pittsfield Mets.

In the summer, concerts are held in Wahconah Park. It is also home to varsity football games for Pittsfield-area high schools.

Professional teams at Wahconah Park

Future Major League Pittsfield players

Lew Wendell, Electrics (1913)
Pat Parker, Electrics (1914)
Otto Rettig, Electrics (1914)
Cliff Brady, Hillies (1919–20)
Paddy Smith, Hillies (1920)
Charlie Hargreaves, Hillies (1921–1922)
Bob Barrett, Hillies (1923)
Joe Batchelder, Hillies (1923, 1926)
Si Rosenthal, Hillies (1923)
Ed Taylor, Hillies (1923)
Clay Van Alstyne, Hillies (1923–1924)
Earl Webb, Hillies (1923–1924)
Chick Autry, Hillies (1924)
Hal Goldsmith, Hillies (1924)
Mule Haas, Hillies (1924)
Ike Kamp, Hillies (1924)
Hunter Lane, Hillies (1924)
Art Mills, Hillies (1924–1926)
Joe Benes, Hillies (1925)
Bill Cronin, Hillies (1926)
Paul Richards, Hillies (1926)
Charlie Bates, Hillies (1927)
Joe Cascarella, Hillies (1927–1928)
Augie Walsh, Hillies (1927)
Jack Burns, Hillies (1928)
Ed Connolly, Hillies (1928–1929)
George Loepp, Hillies (1928)
Joe Cicero, Hillies (1929)
Ed Durham, Hillies (1929)
Frank Mulroney, Hillies (1929)
Owen Kahn, Hillies (1930)
Jorge Comellas, Electrics (1941)
Walt Linden, Electrics (1941)
John O'Neil, Electrics (1942)
Al Rosen, Electrics (1946)
Hal Naragon, Electrics (1947)
Jim Lemon, Electrics (1948)
Don Minnick, Indians (1949)
Brooks Lawrence, Indians (1950)
Stan Pawloski, Indians (1950)
Dick Tomanek, Indians (1950)
Chris Coletta, Red Sox (1965–1969)
Pete Magrini, Red Sox (1965)
Al Montreuil, Red Sox (1965–1968)
Jerry Moses, Red Sox (1965–1967)
George Scott, Red Sox (1965)
Reggie Smith, Red Sox (1965)
Gary Waslewski, Red Sox (1965)
Fred Wenz, Red Sox (1965)
Billy Conigliaro, Red Sox (1966, 1968)
Carmen Fanzone, Red Sox (1966–1968)
Jerry Janeski, Red Sox (1966, 1968)
Sparky Lyle, Red Sox (1966)
Bobby Mitchell, Red Sox (1966–1967)
Bob Montgomery, Red Sox (1966)
Ken Wright, Red Sox (1966–1968)
Ken Brett, Red Sox (1967)
Russ Gibson, Red Sox (1967)
Ron Klimkowski, Red Sox (1967)
Ed Phillips, Red Sox (1967)
Ken Poulsen, Red Sox (1967)
Luis Alvarado, Red Sox (1968)
Dick Baney, Red Sox (1968)
Mark Schaeffer, Red Sox (1968)
Carlton Fisk, Red Sox (1969)
Buddy Hunter, Red Sox (1969)
Bill Lee, Red Sox (1969)
Rick Miller, Red Sox (1969)
Dick Mills, Red Sox (1969)
Larry Biittner, Senators (1970)
Don Castle, Senators (1970)
Dave Moates, Senators (1970–1972)
Rick Stelmaszek, Senators (1970)
John Wockenfuss, Senators & Rangers (1970–1972)
Steve Foucault, Senators (1970)
Bill Gogolewski, Senators (1970)
Rick Henninger, Senators & Rangers (1970–1971)
Jeff Terpko, Senators & Rangers (1970–1971, 1974)
Mike Thompson, Senators (1970)
Bill Fahey, Rangers (1971)
Jim Kremmel, Rangers (1971–1972)
Joe Lovitto, Rangers (1971)
Bill Madlock, Rangers (1971–1972)
Rick Waits, Rangers (1971–1972)
Jim Kremmel, Rangers (1971–1972)
Lew Beasley, Rangers (1972–1975)
Roy Howell, Rangers (1972–1973)
Pete Mackanin, Rangers (1972)
Greg Pryor, Rangers (1972, 1974)
Tom Robson, Rangers (1972–1973)
Dave Criscione, Rangers (1973)
Mike Cubbage, Rangers (1973)
Ken Pape, Rangers (1973–1974)
Jim Sundberg, Rangers (1973)
Stan Thomas, Rangers(1973)
Doug Ault, Rangers (1974–1975)
Brian Doyle, Rangers (1974)
Ron Pruitt, Rangers (1974)
Jim Umbarger, Rangers (1974)
Len Barker, Rangers (1975)
Tommy Boggs, Rangers (1975)
Dan Duran, Rangers (1975)
Greg Mahlberg, Rangers (1975)
John Poloni, Rangers (1975)
Keith Smith, Rangers (1975)
John Sutton, Rangers (1975)
Bump Wills, Rangers (1975)
Dick Davis, Brewers (1976)
Greg Erardi, Brewers (1976)
Gary Holle, Brewers (1976)
Dan Thomas, Brewers (1976)
Gary Beare, Brewers (1976)
Barry Cort, Brewers (1976)
Sam Hinds, Brewers (1976)
Johnny Abrego, Cubs (1985)
Mike Brumley, Cubs (1985)
Mike Capel, Cubs (1985–1986)
Steve Engel, Cubs (1985)
Darrin Jackson, Cubs (1985–1986)
Jamie Moyer, Cubs (1985)
Gary Varsho, Cubs (1985–1986)
Rich Amaral, Cubs (1986–1988)
Damon Berryhill, Cubs (1986)
Drew Hall, Cubs (1986)
Les Lancaster, Cubs (1986)
Greg Maddux, Cubs (1986)
Mike Martin, Cubs (1986)
Paul Noce, Cubs (1986)
Rafael Palmeiro, Cubs (1986)
Rolando Roomes, Cubs (1986–1987)
Phil Stephenson, Cubs (1986)
Doug Dascenzo, Cubs (1987)
Mark Grace, Cubs (1987)
Dave Pavlas, Cubs (1987)
Jeff Pico, Cubs (1987)
Laddie Renfroe, Cubs (1987–1988)
Rich Scheid, Cubs (1987–1988)
Dwight Smith, Cubs (1987)
Héctor Villanueva, Cubs (1987–1988)
Rick Wrona, Cubs (1987–1988)
Jim Bullinger, Cubs (1988)
Joe Girardi, Cubs (1988)
Mike Harkey, Cubs (1988)
Joe Kraemer, Cubs (1988)
Ced Landrum, Cubs (1988)
Kelly Mann, Cubs (1988)
Jeff Schwarz, Cubs (1988)
Jerome Walton, Cubs (1988)
Dean Wilkins, Cubs (1988)
Alberto Castillo, Mets (1989–1990)
Denny Harriger, Mets (1989)
Pat Howell, Mets (1989)
John Johnstone, Mets (1989)
Tito Navarro, Mets (1989)
Curtis Pride, Mets (1989)
Dave Telgheder, Mets (1989)
Joe Vitko, Mets (1989)
Alan Zinter, Mets (1989)
Jeromy Burnitz, Mets (1990)
Mike Thomas, Mets (1990)
Pete Walker, Mets (1990)
Juan Castillo, Mets (1990)
Micah Franklin, Mets (1991)
Guillermo Garcia, Mets (1991–1992)
Ricky Otero, Mets (1991)
Quilvio Veras, Mets (1991)
Héctor Carrasco, Mets (1991)
Edgardo Alfonzo, Mets (1992)
Brian Daubach, Mets (1992)
Bill Pulsipher, Mets (1992)
Benny Agbayani, Mets (1993)
Preston Wilson, Mets (1993)
Jason Isringhausen, Mets (1993)
Eric Ludwick, Mets (1993)
Allen McDill, Mets (1993)
Jeff Tam, Mets (1993)
Mike Welch, Mets (1993)
Jarrod Patterson, Mets (1994)
Jay Payton, Mets (1994)
Scott Sauerbeck, Mets (1994)
Vance Wilson, Mets (1994)
Terrence Long, Mets (1995)
Dan Murray, Mets (1995)
Ramón Tatís, Mets (1995)
Brandon Villafuerte, Mets (1996)
A. J. Burnett, Mets (1997)
Eric Cammack, Mets (1997)
Leo Estrella, Mets (1997)
Jason Phillips, Mets (1997)
Jason Roach, Mets (1997, 2000)
Earl Snyder, Mets (1998)
Ty Wigginton, Mets (1998)
Chris Başak, Mets (2000)
Jaime Cerda, Mets (2000)
Jeff Duncan, Mets (2000)
Philip Barzilla, Astros (2001)
Brooks Conrad, Astros (2001)
Charlton Jimerson, Astros (2001)
Todd Self, Astros (2001)

Pittsfield players with previous Major League experience

Art Nichols, Electrics (1913)
Jock Somerlott, Electrics (1913–1914)
Polly Wolfe, Electrics (1913–1914)
Bun Troy, Electrics (1914)
Frank Nicholson, Electrics (1914)
Joe Birmingham, Hillies (1919–1920)
Mickey Devine, Hillies (1919)
Gary Fortune, Hillies (1919)
Jack Hammond, Hillies (1919–1921)
Bobby Messenger, Hillies (1919–1920)
Ty Pickup, Hillies (1919–1920)
Johnny Tillman, Hillies (1919–1923)
Lew Wendell, Hillies (1919)
Frank Kelliher, Hillies (1920)
Colonel Snover, Hillies (1920–1925)
Bill McCorry, Hillies (1921–1923)
Al Pierotti, Hillies (1921–1922)
Ernie Neitzke, Hillies (1922)
Danny Silva, Hillies (1922)
Eddie Zimmerman, Hillies (1922)
Neal Ball, Hillies (1923)
Chick Gagnon, Hillies (1923)
Hal Leathers, Hillies (1923)
Bunny Roser, Hillies (1923)
Art Wilson, Hillies (1923)
Mike Wilson, Hillies (1923)
Jimmy Esmond, Hillies (1924)
Waddy Macphee, Hillies (1924–1925)
Horace Milan, Hillies (1924, 1926)
Mose Solomon, Hillies (1924)
Red Torphy, Hillies (1924–1925)
Shano Collins, Hillies (1925, 1928)
Lefty Jamerson, Hillies (1925–1926)
Tom Sullivan, Hillies (1925)
Augie Swentor, Hillies (1925)
Rowdy Elliott, Hillies (1926)
Ken Jones, Hillies (1926)
Sam Mayer, Hillies (1926, 1929)
John Perrin, Hillies (1926)
Red Sheridan, Hillies (1926–1928)
Ed Sperber, Hillies (1926)
Dan Woodman, Hillies (1926)
Ed Baecht, Hillies (1927)
Harry Baldwin, Hillies (1927–1928)
Ed Miller, Hillies (1927)
Frank Parkinson, Hillies (1927–1928)
John Shea, Hillies (1928–1929)
Joe Smith, Hillies (1927)
Red Smith, Hillies (1927)
Denny Sothern, Hillies (1927)
Lefty Taber, Hillies (1927)
Mule Watson, Hillies (1927)
Frank Bennett, Hillies (1928)
Herb Bradley, Hillies (1928–1929)
Ralph Head, Hillies (1928)
Red Shea, Hillies (1928)
Charlie Small, Hillies (1928–1930)
Harry Wilke, Hillies (1928–1930)
Casper Asbjornson, Hillies (1929)
Frank Bushey, Hillies (1928–1929)
Freddie Moncewicz, Hillies (1929)
José Rodríguez (infielder), Hillies (1929–1930)
Pat Simmons, Hillies (1929–1930)
Carl Sumner, Hillies (1929)
Hod Lisenbee, Hillies (1929)
Maurice Archdeacon, Hillies (1930)
Jim Bishop, Hillies (1930)
Ray Dobens, Hillies (1930)
Bob Emmerich, Hillies (1930)
Bill Holland, Electrics (1941)
Glenn Spencer, Electrics (1941)
Tony Rensa, Electrics (1946–1947)
Gene Hasson, Electrics & Indians (1948–1949)
Lloyd Brown, Indians (1950)
Dave Gray, Red Sox (1965)
Billy MacLeod, Red Sox (1965)
Pete Smith, Red Sox (1965)
Ed Connolly, Red Sox (1966)
Bobby Guindon, Red Sox (1966–1968)
Pete Charton, Red Sox (1967)
Galen Cisco, Red Sox (1967)
Billy Gardner, Red Sox (1967, 1969)
Bill Schlesinger, Red Sox (1967–1968)
Jose Tartabull, Red Sox (1967)
Dave Gray, Red Sox (1968–1969)
Russ Nixon, Red Sox (1968)
Fred Wenz, Red Sox (1969)
Tom Parsons, Red Sox (1969)
Toby Harrah, Senators (1970)
Gene Martin, Senators (1970)
Charley Walters, Senators & Rangers (1971–1972)
Dick Such, Rangers (1973)
Tommy Cruz, Rangers (1974)
Marty Martínez, Rangers (1975)
Lafayette Currence, Brewers (1976)
Lary Sorensen, Brewers (1976)
Jeff Cornell, Cubs (1985)
Steve Hammond, Cubs (1985)
Jeff Jones, Cubs (1985)
Dickie Noles, Cubs (1987)
Al Chambers, Cubs (1988)

See also
National Register of Historic Places listings in Berkshire County, Massachusetts

References

External links
Wahconah Park Views – Ball Parks of the Minor Leagues
Wahconah Park (from Baseball's Canadian–American League)
Wahconah Park photo gallery at digitalballparks.com
Photo of stadium
Photo of right field
Photo of sun setting into batter's eyes
Minor League News – The Sun Sets on Wahconah Park
BallparkReviews.com Photos and Review

Baseball venues in Massachusetts
Minor league baseball venues
National Register of Historic Places in Berkshire County, Massachusetts
Buildings and structures in Pittsfield, Massachusetts
Tourist attractions in Berkshire County, Massachusetts
Futures Collegiate Baseball League ballparks
Event venues on the National Register of Historic Places in Massachusetts
Sports venues on the National Register of Historic Places in Massachusetts
1919 establishments in Massachusetts
Sports venues completed in 1919
Baseball in Pittsfield, Massachusetts